Otranto is a coastal town, port and comune in the province of Lecce (Apulia, Italy), in a fertile region once famous for its breed of horses.

It is located on the east coast of the Salento peninsula. The Strait of Otranto, to which the city gives its name, connects the Adriatic Sea with the Ionian Sea and separates Italy from Albania. The harbour is small and has little trade.

The district between this promontory and Otranto is thickly populated and very fertile.

The area that lies between Otranto and Santa Maria di Leuca is part of the Regional Natural Coastal Park of "Costa Otranto - Santa Maria di Leuca e Bosco di Tricase"  wanted  by the Apulia Region in 2008. This territory has numerous natural and historical attractions such as Ciolo, which is a rocky cove.

History

Otranto occupies the site of the ancient Greek city Hydrus (in Greek: Ὑδροῦς) or Hydruntum (in Latin), also known as Hydrunton, Hydronton, or Hydruntu. Otranto was a town of Messapian (Illyrian) origin, which, in the wars of Pyrrhus and of Hannibal sided against Rome.

In Roman times it was a city. As it is the nearest port to the eastern coast of the Adriatic Sea, it was perhaps more important than Brundisium (present Brindisi), under the Roman emperors as a point of embarkation for the East, as the distance to Apollonia, (in present Albania) was less than from Brundisium.

In the 8th century, it was for some time in the possession of duke Arechis II of Benevento. 

On 17 August 928, the city was sacked by a Fatimid fleet under Sabir al-Fata. Its inhabitants were carried to North Africa as slaves. It remained in the hands of the Byzantine emperors until it was among the last cities of Apulia to surrender to the Norman Robert Guiscard in 1068, and then became part of the Principality of Taranto. In the Middle Ages the Jews had a school there.

Ottoman invasion

In 1480, Sultan Mehmed II sent an Ottoman fleet to invade Rome under the command of Gedik Ahmed Pasha. This force reached the shores of Apulia on 28 July 1480 and the city was captured in two weeks on 11 August 1480. All of the male inhabitants were slaughtered by the victorious Ottomans. Of the 22,000 inhabitants there were only 10,000 that were left alive. Some 800 citizens, known as the "Martyrs of Otranto," were beheaded after refusing to convert to Islam. They were canonized by Pope Francis on 12 May 2013.  Archbishop Stefano Pendinelli was also martyred.

Between August and September 1480, the Italian and European kingdoms failed to help King Ferdinand of Naples, except his cousin Ferdinand the Catholic, the Kingdom of Sicily and, later, the Republic of Genoa. In 1481, the Pope, in panic, called for a crusade to be led by King Ferdinand of Naples, and was joined by troops of Hungarian king Matthias Corvinus. The Turks controlled the city for 13 months. Sultan Mehmed II died on his way to capture the rest of Italy. His successor, Sultan Bayezid II, ordered Gedik Ahmed Pasha to be hanged and on 11 September 1481 the Turks abandoned the city.

In 1537, the famous Turkish corsair and Ottoman admiral Barbarossa recaptured Otranto and the Fortress of Castro, but the Turks were again repulsed from the city and from the rest of Apulia.

Napoleonic Wars

In 1804, the city was obliged to harbour a French garrison that was established there to watch the movements of the English fleet. Under the French name of Otrante it was created a duché grand-fief de l'Empire in the Napoleonic kingdom of Naples for Joseph Fouché, Napoleon's minister of Police (1809), the ancestor of Margareta Fouché. The family used the title of  duc d'Otrante after Joseph Fouché's death.

World War I

During WWI the allied Italian-French-British Fleet organized the Otranto Barrage to control the Austro-Hungarian Fleet in the Adriatic Sea. The Austro-Hungarian Fleet led by captain Miklós Horthy attacked the Barrage (13 -15 May 1917) breaking it and sinking some British drifters (Battle of the Strait of Otranto (1917)).

World War II

During WWII the British fleet raided the Otranto Channel (11-12 November 1940) as a diversionary manoeuvre (Battle of the Strait of Otranto (1940) from the contemporary main attack on Taranto (Battle of Taranto). During the time a long piece of shore located in Otranto was given to the Albanian protectorate of Italy which upkept the plan of placing defences of both sides of the Strait to cover up any attacks. It was not finished after all. Whatsoever no deal was later done to make any changes on that shore piece which is assumed to belong to Albania this day.

Geography

Climate 
Otranto experiences a humid subtropical climate (Köppen climate classification Cfa) with long, hot summers and short, cool winters.

Main sights

Otranto main sights include:
 The Castello Aragonese (Castle), reinforced by Emperor Frederick II and rebuilt by Alphonso II of Naples in 1485–98. It has an irregular plan with five sides, with a moat running along the entire perimeter. In origin it had a single entrance, reachable through a draw-bridge. Towers include three cylindrical ones and a bastion called Punta di Diamante ("Diamond's Head"). The entrance sports the coat of arms of Emperor Charles V.
 The Cathedral, consecrated in 1088, a work of Count Roger I adorned later (about 1163), by Bishop Jonathas, with a mosaic floor; it has a rose window and side portal of 1481. The interior, a basilica with nave and two aisles, contains columns said to come from a temple of Minerva and a fine mosaic pavement of 1166, with interesting representations of the months, Old Testament subjects and others. Bones and relics of the Martyrs of Otranto, who perished in the 15th-century siege surround the high altar.  The church has a crypt supported by 42 marble columns. The same Count Roger also founded a Basilian monastery here, which, under Abbot Nicetas, became a place of study; its library was nearly all bought by Bessarion.
 The church of San Pietro, with Byzantine frescoes.
 The catacombs of Torre Pinta.
 Idro, a small river which the toponym Otranto stems from.

Culture
Otranto is the setting of Horace Walpole's book The Castle of Otranto, which is generally held to be the first Gothic novel. Walpole had chosen the town from a map of the Kingdom of Naples because the name was "well-sounding"; he was not aware that Otranto had a castle until 1786, some twenty-two years after the novel was first published under a pseudonym. The principal model for the castle was his villa in Strawberry Hill, London.

Otranto is also mentioned in Bram Stoker's novel The Lady of the Shroud.

International relations

Twin towns – Sister cities
Otranto is twinned  with:
  Sarandë, Albania

See also
 Bishopric of Otranto
 Otranto Tragedy
 Ottoman invasion of Otranto

Sources
 
 
 Heraldica.org- Napoleonic
 GigaCatholic

References

External links

 archdiocsan website 
 Adrian Fletcher’s Paradoxplace – Otranto Cathedral Mosaics Photo Page
 Otrano Video in English

Colonies of Magna Graecia
Castles in Italy
Coastal towns in Apulia
Localities of Salento
Port cities and towns of the Adriatic Sea
Territories of the Republic of Venice